{{DISPLAYTITLE:Kappa2 Lupi}}

κ2 Lupi, Latinized as Kappa2 Lupi, is a white-hued star in the southern constellation of Lupus, and forms a double star with Kappa1 Lupi. It is visible to the naked eye as a dim point of light with an apparent visual magnitude is 5.64. This star is located around 181 light years distant from the Sun. It is an A-type main-sequence star with a stellar classification of A3/5V. However, Levato (1973) classed the star as A3IV, which would suggest it is already evolving off the main sequence. The star has a high rotation rate, showing a projected rotational velocity of 160 km/s.

References

A-type main-sequence stars
A-type subgiants
Lupus (constellation)
Lupi, Kappa2
Durchmusterung objects
134482
074380
5647